Sofia Sergeyevna Biryukova (born 19 July 1994) is a Russian figure skater. She is the 2013 Winter Universiade champion and 2011 Finlandia Trophy champion.

Career 
Biryukova competed in the 2009–10 ISU Junior Grand Prix series, winning a silver medal in Turkey. The following season, she began competing on the senior level internationally. She appeared at her first senior Grand Prix event, the 2010 Cup of Russia.

Biryukova began the 2011–12 season by winning gold at the 2011 Finlandia Trophy. She placed 4th at the 2011 Cup of Russia, setting personal bests in both programs. Toward the end of the season, she sustained four fractures.

In the 2012–2013 season, Biryukova was assigned to two ISU Grand Prix events, the 2012 Cup of China and 2012 NHK Trophy, and finished 9th at both.

Biryukova won the gold medal at the 2013 Winter Universiade. Since Butsaeva was unable to attend, Svetlana Sokolovskaya stepped in to work with her at the event.

Pair Skating Career 

In spring 2014, Biryukova decided to try pair skating. After telling her coach, Butsaeva, Butsaeva contacted pairs coach, Nina Mozer, and Mozer invited Biryukova to watch the pair skating at the Vorobyovy Gory where she coaches. After deciding she wanted to switch to pair skating, Mozer agreed to let her train at the rink and paired her up with Aleksandr Stepanov in the fall of 2014, who was also a singles skater that wanted to switch to pair skating. Pavel Alexandrovich Kitashev became the pair team's coach. On January 13, 2015, however, Biryukova stated she was unsure if she would continue pair skating or start coaching, feeling as though she hadn't made a lot of progress as a pair skater.

Deciding to end her pair skating career, Biryukova ended her partnership with Stepanov. Four months later, however, Biryukova was contacted by Nina Mozer, who convinced her to tryout with pair skater Andrei Filonov, who was looking for a partner. After a successful tryout, the pair decided to skate together and are coached by Dmitri Savin.

The pair made their skating debut at the 2016 Russian Figure Skating Championships, where they placed 7th.

Programs

With Filonov

Singles Skating

Competition highlights

With Filonov

Singles Skating

References

External links 

 
 Sofia Biryukova at sport-folio.net
 Sofia Biryukova at fskate.ru 

1994 births
Living people
Russian female single skaters
Universiade medalists in figure skating
Figure skaters from Moscow
Universiade gold medalists for Russia
Competitors at the 2013 Winter Universiade